Jim Marpe is an American businessman and politician, who served two terms as First Selectman of Westport, Connecticut from 2013 to 2021. A Republican, Marpe previously served on the Westport Public Schools Board of Education, included as acting chaiman, and as an executive at Accenture.

Marpe oversaw an expansion of senior citizen services, restoration of parks and recreation facilities, and Westport's response to the COVID-19 pandemic.

References 

Connecticut Republicans
Westport, Connecticut
21st-century American politicians
Living people
Year of birth missing (living people)